Who is William Onyeabor? is a 2013 compilation album by William Onyeabor released by Luaka Bop. The music was compiled by Uchenna Ikonne and was the first official re-issue of his music.
Metacritic described the album as receiving "Universal acclaim" with Pitchfork citing it as one of the "best reissues" and NPR listing it as one of the best albums of 2013.

Background
The music label Luaka Bop had previously released the albums World Psychedelic Classics 3: Love's A Real Thing - The Funky Fuzzy Sounds Of West Africa and Nigeria 70 in the early 2000s which Pitchfork described as helping "spur a revival in African music from the continent’s “Golden Age,”". Following the release of their first albums, Luaka Bop attempted to find musician William Onyeabor whose  song "Better Change Your Mind" appeared on both Nigeria 70 and Love's A Real Thing set.

Information ranged about Onyeabor with the only confirmed information being that he had self-released eight albums between 1977 and 1985 before disavowing music for Christianity. Nigerian blogger Uchenna Ikonne contacted the musician in 2009, describing it as the "toughest ordeal I had ever endured in my life" and got him signed to a contract with Luaka Bop. Four years after contacting him initially, Eric Welles-Nystrom of Luaka Bop went to Nigeria to find him and got Onyeabor to accept an album to be released. Welles-Nystrom noted that compiling the music was supposed to take "a month, that was five years ago."

Release
Who is William Onyeabor? was released on by Luaka Bop on October 29, 2013. Who is William Onyeabor? is the first legitimate reissue of his music. Onyeabor's music has been bootlegged while original copies can go for upwards of $500 online.

Reception

On Metacritic, Who is William Onyeabor? received an average score of 82 based on eight reviews.

The album lead the nominations at the 2014 A2IM Libera Awards, a not-for-profit trade organization representing the independent music business. The nominations included "Independent Album of the Year", "Video of the Year", "Breakthrough Artist of the Year" and the Light Bulb Award.

Track listing

References

2013 compilation albums
William Onyeabor albums
Luaka Bop compilation albums